Walter Isidro Ramírez (born November 7, 1983) is a Honduran footballer who plays for Miami United FC in the National Premier Soccer League.

Career
After playing with the amateur teams Real Honduras and Honduras Five Star (Honduras Cinco Estrellas) in the prestigious Florida-based Copa Latina, Ramírez signed with Miami FC of the USL First Division prior to their first season in competition in 2006. He has since gone on to be a mainstay in Miami's defensive line, playing in over 50 games for the team.

Nicknamed Black, Ramírez signed a contract with Vida of Liga Nacional de Honduras in Summer 2010.

Ramírez returned to the United States when he signed with the expansion San Antonio Scorpions of the North American Soccer League on December 21, 2011.

On January 30, 2014 Ramírez signed with the expansion Indy Eleven of the North American Soccer League On July 8, 2014 Ramírez was released by Indy Eleven.

In August 2014 Ramírez signed with Fort Lauderdale Strikers of NASL. He remained with the club through the end of 2015 before signing with Tampa Bay Rowdies on 24 December 2015.

References

External links
 Profile - USL Soccer

1983 births
Living people
People from La Ceiba
Association football midfielders
Honduran footballers
Miami FC (2006) players
C.D.S. Vida players
San Antonio Scorpions players
Indy Eleven players
Fort Lauderdale Strikers players
Tampa Bay Rowdies players
Puerto Rico FC players
Penn FC players
USL First Division players
North American Soccer League players
USL Championship players
Honduran expatriate footballers
Expatriate soccer players in the United States
National Premier Soccer League players